King of the Wild Horses is a 1933 American Columbia Pictures Western film directed by Earl Haley. It was produced and released by Columbia Pictures with stunts by Yakima Canutt.

Cast
Rex the Wonder Horse as Rex
Lady the Horse as The Mare
Marquis the Horse as Rex's Rival
William Janney as Two Feathers
Dorothy Appleby as Napeeta
Wallace MacDonald as Gorman
Harry Semels as John Foster
Ford West as Dr. Anderson
Art Mix as Haley
Charles LeMoyne as a henchman(*uncredited)

Preservation status
A print is held in the Library of Congress collection.

References

External links

1933 films
Columbia Pictures films
American Western (genre) films
1933 Western (genre) films
American black-and-white films
1930s American films
1930s English-language films